Al-Mizan fi Tafsir al-Qur'an ("The balance in Interpretation of Quran"), more commonly known as Tafsir al-Mizan or simply Al-Mizan, is a tafsir (exegesis of the Quran) written by the Shia Muslim scholar and philosopher Allamah Sayyid Muhammad Husayn Tabataba'i (1892–1981).

The book consists of 27 volumes originally written in Arabic. Up till now more than three editions have been printed in Iran and Lebanon.

Method

Allameh Tabatabaei's method for interpretation of the Qur'an is the so-called Quran by Quran method. In his book Qur'an dar Islam ("The [place of the] Qur'an in Islam"), Tabataba'i discusses the problem of the interpretation of the Qur'an. Pointing to the interrelatedness of the Quranic verses and arguing based on some Quranic verses and Islamic tradition, he concludes that a valid interpretation of Quran could be achieved only through contemplation of all other related verses, and consulting Islamic traditions whenever it is necessary.

Translations
Tafsir al-Mizan was translated into English (first 13 volumes out of 40) by author and renowned Shia preacher Syed Saeed Akhtar Rizvi.
The rest of the translation work is undertaken by various translators and managed and funded by Tawheed Institute Australia.

See also
List of Shia books

References

External links
English Translation of Tafsir al-Mizan
English Publication of Tafsir al-Mizan including some glimpses
Arabic online digital versions    

Shia tafsir
20th-century Arabic books
Books by Muhammad Husayn Tabatabai
Shia literature